Hadroibidion is a genus of beetles in the family Cerambycidae, containing the following species:

 Hadroibidion nanum (Gounelle, 1911)
 Hadroibidion pullum (Martins, 1962)
 Hadroibidion vulgare Martins & Napp, 1986

References

Ibidionini